Neil Hamilton may refer to:

Neil Hamilton (actor) (1899–1984), American actor
Neil Hamilton (politician) (born 1949), British politician, former Senedd member and leader of UKIP
Neil Hamilton (lawyer) (fl. late 20th century), American lawyer and author

See also
Neil Hamilton Fairley, Australian physician and soldier